Dogdakedar (Nepali: दोगडाकेदार ) is a Gaupalika(Nepali: गाउपालिका ; gaupalika) in Baitadi District in the Sudurpashchim Province of far-western Nepal. 
Dogdakedar has a population of 24632.The land area is 126.38 km2.

References

Rural municipalities in Baitadi District
Populated places in Baitadi District
Rural municipalities of Nepal established in 2017